"Love in a Peaceful World" is a song released in July 1994 by the British musical group Level 42, from their final studio album of the decade, Forever Now.

The song peaked at #31 on the UK Singles Chart, and is the last single of Level 42 to enter the charts. The music video of this song is the final video recorded by Level 42, with Jeff Baynes as director. The single was released only in the United Kingdom.

The song appears on the compilation album Past Lives – The Best of the RCA Years, released in 2007 which features their greatest hit songs from 1991–1996 when the band was with RCA.

Personnel
Mark King - bass/vocals
Mike Lindup - keyboards/vocals
Phil Gould - drums
Wally Badarou - keyboards
Danny Bloom - guitars

References

1994 singles
1994 songs
Level 42 songs
RCA Records singles
Songs written by Phil Gould (musician)